The Khmost is a river in Dukhovshchinsky, Smolensky, and Kardymovsky Districts of Smolensk Oblast, Russia, a right tributary of the Dnieper. The settlement of Kardymovo is located near the river mouth.

The source of the Khmost is in the west of Dukhovshchina District, north of the village of Vasino. It flows south and downstream of the village of Botino makes the border between Dukhovshchinsky and Smolensky Districts. A short stretch of the river crosses Smolensky District, then the river turns east and forms the border between Dukhovshchinsky and Kardymovsky Districts. In the village of Lisichino, it departs from the border and flows southeast through Kardymovsky District. The mouth of the Khmost is south of the village of Ryzhkovo.

References

Rivers of Smolensk Oblast